The 1987 Singapore Open, also known as the Konica Cup - The Invitational Asian Badminton Championships, took place from 18 ~ 22 February 1987 at the Singapore Badminton Hall in Singapore. It was the first edition of this event. The total prize money on offer was US$31,000.

Medalists

Final results

Bronze medal matches

See also 
1987 Asian Badminton Championships

References 

Badminton Asia Championships
Singapore Open (badminton)
1987 in badminton
1987 in Singaporean sport